Shakambhari (Sanskrit: शाकम्भरी, IAST: Śākambharī), also referred to as Shatakshi, is a goddess of nourishment. She is regarded to be an incarnation of Mahadevi, and identified with both Lakshmi and Durga in Hinduism. After the malevolent asura Durgamasura deprived the earth of nourishment by causing the sages to forget the Vedas, the goddess appeared to offer human beings and devas sufficient fruits and vegetables to restore their strength.

Etymology 
The word śākaṃbharī means 'she who bears vegetables'. The word is derived from two words- śāka (Sanskrit: शाक) which means 'vegetable/vegan food' and bharī (Sanskrit: भरी) which means 'holder/bearer/wearer' which is ultimately derived from the root word bhṛ (Sanskrit: भृ) which means 'to bear/to wear/to nourish'.

Legend 
After the asura Durgamasura sought to plunge the earth in drought and scarcity, a century of suffering endured on earth, when the sages finally remembered the goddess Lakshmi after the asura had made them forget about the Vedas, she appeared upon the worlds in a dark-hued blue form, casting her hundred eyes on the sages. When the sages extolled and chanted the hymns of Ishvari, the four-handed goddess appeared bearing a lotus, arrows, a great bow, and vegetables, fruits, flower, and roots. According to the Devi Bhagavata Purana, seeing the misery of the people, she showered incessant tears from her eyes, streaming into rivers, and offering medicines. Lakshmi shares her deed with Indra in the Lakshmi Tantra:

Further reading 
 Annapurna
 Ishtar
 Ceres 
 Demeter

References

Hindu goddesses
Lakshmi
Forms of Parvati